Bundaberg East is a suburb of Bundaberg in the Bundaberg Region, Queensland, Australia. In the  Bundaberg East had a population of 2,784 people.

History 
A Government land sale of eighty allotments was advertised for auction by W. E. Curtis on 6 June 1882. The map advertising the auction stated the allotments were down river a mile from Bundaberg and fronted Scotland Street, Princes Street and George Street, located near Cran & Co's Refinery and Manchester & Scott's Saw Mills.

St Matthew's Anglican Church Bundaberg East was opened in 1906 and closed in 1975. It was sold because of population drift.

Bundaberg East State School opened on 1 July 1886.

In 2005, Bundaberg Brewed Drinks opened their tourist facility, the Bundaberg Barrel, one of Australia's big things, in Bundaberg East. The Barrel has a 3D hologram video, interactive displays on the brewing process and taste testing.

Heritage listings
Bundaberg East has a number of heritage-listed sites, including:
 Bourbong Street: Kennedy Bridge
 Quay Street: Saltwater Creek Railway Bridge
 17 Sussex Street: East Bundaberg Water Tower

Education
Bundaberg East State School is a government primary (Prep-6) school for boys and girls at 33 Scotland Street. In 2018, the school had an enrolment of 587 students with 41 teachers (36 full-time equivalent) and 36 non-teaching staff (22 full-time equivalent). It includes a special education program.

There is no secondary school in Bundaberg East. The nearest secondary schools are Kepnock State High School in neighbouring Kepnock to the south and Bundaberg State High School in neighbouring Bundaberg South to the south-west.

Amenities 
Bundaberg Wesleyan Methodist Church is at 1A Princess Street. It is part of the Wesleyan Methodist Church of Australia.

Attractions 
The Bundaberg Rum Distillery is at Hills Street. It offers tours, a museum and tastings.

Bundaberg Brewed Drinks is at 147 Bargara Road. It offers tours and tastings.

References

External links

Bundaberg East, Queensland